Ceratophyllus garei, the duck flea, is a species of flea in the family Ceratophyllidae. It was described by Rothschild in 1902.

References 

Ceratophyllidae
Insects described in 1902